Ju Jong-chol (born 20 October 1994) is a North Korean footballer. He represented North Korea on at least eight occasions between 2013 and 2017.

Career statistics

International

References

External links

1994 births
Living people
Sportspeople from Pyongyang
North Korean footballers
North Korea youth international footballers
North Korea international footballers
Association football midfielders
Amnokgang Sports Club players